Buttaba is a suburb of the City of Lake Macquarie in New South Wales, Australia on the western shore of Lake Macquarie between the towns of Toronto and Morisset, near Rathmines.

References

External links
 History of Buttaba (Lake Macquarie City Library)

Suburbs of Lake Macquarie